Bailyn Sullivan (born 3 September 1998) is a New Zealand rugby union player, who currently plays as a midfield back or wing for  in New Zealand's National Provincial Championship and for the  in Super Rugby.

Early career

Sullivan was born in Napier in Hawke's Bay, where he attended Napier Boys' High School for four years. He was first selected in the school's First XV team in 2013, as a Year 10 student, and played two years for the team.

In 2015, he moved to Auckland to attend King's College for his final two years of secondary school. He played for the school's First XV team, but unfortunately his second year in the team was cut short due to a season-ending knee injury that required surgery.

Sullivan moved to Hamilton after finishing high school, where the  – via their development team – helped him with his recovery from his knee injury. He played for Hamilton Marist in the Waikato club rugby competition.

Senior career

Sullivan was – for the first time – named in the  squad for the 2017 Mitre 10 Cup season. He made his NPC debut for Waikato on 19 August 2017 against , starting at centre. He scored his first try for the province on 25 August 2017 against .

Later that year, he was named in the Chiefs squad for the 2019 Super Rugby season.

In the three years that Sullivan was part of the Chiefs squad, he made 8 appearances for the franchise. On 6 September 2021, the Chiefs – via their social media – announced that they had released Sullivan. That same day, the  announced that he would join the franchise for the 2022 Super Rugby Pacific season.

The province won the 2021 Bunnings NPC Premiership title after beating  23 – 20 in the Final. Sullivan scored Waikato's two only tries in that game; both were intercept tries. During the provincial union's end-of-season awards function, Sullivan was named the NPC Back of the Year.

He went on to make 12 appearances and score 5 tries for his new franchise during the 2022 Super Rugby Pacific season.

International career

After his first year at King's College, in 2015, Sullivan was named in the New Zealand Barbarians Schools' squad for a game against the New Zealand Secondary Schools team. However, due to multiple injuries in the New Zealand Secondary Schools squad, he trained with and played for that team against New Zealand Barbarians Schools. He didn't travel with the New Zealand Secondary Schools team to Australia for that year's three-match international series.

The following year, he missed out on a spot in the New Zealand Secondary Schools team due to the knee injury he suffered while playing for King's College.

Sullivan was a member of the New Zealand Under-20 side that competed in the 2018 Oceania Rugby Under 20 Championship and the 2018 World Rugby Under 20 Championship.

In June 2022, Sullivan – who is of Ngāti Kahungunu descent – was named in the Māori All Blacks squad to take on Ireland during their 2022 tour of New Zealand. He made his debut for the side on 29 June 2022, when the Māori All Blacks beat Ireland 32–17 in Hamilton.

On 10 October 2022, Sullivan was named in the All Blacks XV squad for two matches against Ireland A and the Barbarians during their Northern Tour. He made his debut for the side – via the bench – on 13 November 2022 against the Barbarians and scored a try on debut.

Career honours

Waikato

Bunnings NPC Premiership - 2021

Reference list

External links
itsrugby.co.uk profile

Living people
1998 births
Ngāti Kahungunu people
People educated at Napier Boys' High School
People educated at King's College, Auckland
Rugby union players from Napier, New Zealand
New Zealand rugby union players
New Zealand Māori rugby union players
Rugby union centres
Rugby union wings
Chiefs (rugby union) players
Waikato rugby union players
Hurricanes (rugby union) players